Swisher Sweets is a cigar brand manufactured by Swisher INC. Their headquarters in Jacksonville, Florida was established in 1959.

Swisher Sweets cigars were first introduced in 1958 and are now available in many tastes and blends.

Swisher Sweets was involved in a lawsuit in 2016 in which Swisher International was fined $84.6 million for anticompetitive business practices.

Swisher Sweets products include:

 Swisher Sweets Classics: Available in blends including Original, Diamonds, Green Sweets, Mango, Black, Strawberry, Grape, Peach, Blueberry, Chocolate and Tropical Fusion.
 Swisher Sweets Encore Edition: Blends include Sticky Sweets, Banana Smash, Wild Rush, Arctic Ice, and White Grape. 
 Swisher Sweets Limited Edition: Only available for a limited time in blends including Sweet Cream, Swerve, Coastal Cocktail, Coco Blue, Boozy Watermelon, Maui Pineapple, Cherry Dynamite and Purple Swish.
 Swisher Sweets Minis: Available in blends including Original, Green Sweets, Diamonds, Island Bash, Sticky Sweets, Grape, Tropical Storm, and Blueberry.
 Swisher Sweets BLK: Flavors include Smooth, Grape, Cherry, Berry, and Wine.
 Swisher Sweets: Available in Original, Mellow, Sweet Cherry, Grape, Peach, Full Blend, and Menthol.

References

External links
 A Look Back: Jacksonville-based Swisher International
 Swisher International
 Swisher International Looks Toward 'Record Growth' With Internal Moves
 Swisher Wins Three FCMA Awards
 Swisher Reaches Sesquicentennial

Cigar brands